The 2009 Donington Park Superleague Formula round was the third round of the 2009 Superleague Formula season, with the races taking place on 2 August 2009. Support race events included the Historic Formula One Championship, British Superkart and Formula Jedi.

Report

Qualifying
Antônio Pizzonia took a fortunate second pole of the season, as qualifying was canned after the group stages due to heavy rain at Donington. As his lap time with much faster than the time of Davide Rigon, the quickest driver of Group B, he was given the benefit of pole position. Rigon will line up second, as all the Group B cars will fill that side of the grid.

Race 1

Race 2

Super Final

Results

Qualifying
 Due to adverse weather conditions, the knockout stages were cancelled. As Group A achieved faster times than Group B, the Group A cars lined up in the odd-numbered positions on the grid, with the Group B cars on the even-numbered positions.

Group A

Group B

Grid

Race 1

Race 2

 Olympiacos CFP started from the pitlane.

Super Final

Standings after the round

References

External links
 Official results from the Superleague Formula website

Donington Park
Superleague Formula